The Chartered Institute of Patent Attorneys (CIPA) is the British professional body of patent attorneys.

History
The Chartered Institute of Patent Attorneys (CIPA) was founded in 1882 as the Chartered Institute of Patent Agents and incorporated by Royal Charter in 1891. CIPA changed its name in June 2006.

Objects and function
The objects of CIPA, as set out in its Royal Charter, are:
(a) to act as a professional and representative body for Intellectual Property Practitioners in patents, designs, trade marks and other forms of intellectual property; and
(b) to promote the education, standing, training and continuing professional expertise of intellectual property practitioners and to establish, maintain and enforce high
standards of professional conduct and compliance with the law.

CIPA is named in the Legal Services Act 2007  as the Approved Regulator for the patent attorney profession in the UK. Under the Legal Services Act, CIPA has to separate its regulatory activities from its representative work as the professional body for patent attorneys. In 2010, CIPA and the Chartered Institute of Trade Mark Attorneys (CITMA) set up the Intellectual Property Regulation Board (IPReg) to undertake jointly the regulation of the patent attorney and trade mark attorney professions.

CIPA maintains the statutory Register of Patent Attorneys on behalf of the Department for Business, Energy and Industrial Strategy reporting to the comptroller-general of patents, trade marks and designs at the UK Intellectual Property Office.

Membership

CIPA has a total membership of just under 5,000 members. 3,000 of these members are Fellows of CIPA, holding the professional title of Chartered Patent Attorney (CPA). CIPA typically has 1,200 Student Members, the high ratio of Student Members to Fellows being representative of the length of time taken to qualify as a Chartered Patent Attorney. 500 members are IP Paralegal Members, with the rest of the membership being made up of European Patent Attorneys (EPA) and Associat Members (solicitors, barristers, judges, etc.). CIPA reports annually on the composition of its membership.

Governance

CIPA is governed by an elected Council of twenty-four Fellows. In addition, the members elect President to serve for one year; the President chairs Council. The Fellow elected as President will serve for one year as Vice-President and one year as Immediate Past President. The President, Vice-President and Immediate Past President are the annual officers of CIPA, supported by a Honorary Secretary appointed by Council from amongst its number.

Presidents
This is a list of past presidents of the CIPA.

John Henry Johnson (1882–1884)
John Imray (1884–1886)
William Carpmael (1886–1888)
John Clayton Mewburn (1888–1890)
Sir William Lloyd Wise (1890–1897)
Charles Denton Abel (1897–1899)
Edward Carpmael (1899–1901)
Philip Middleton Justice (1901–1903)
George Gatton Melhuish Hardingham (1903–1905)
John Corry Fell (1905–1907)
William Clark (1907–1909)
Oliver Imray (1909–1911)
Thomas Alfred Hearson (1911–1913)
George Barker (1913–1915)
John Ebenezer Bousfield (1915–1917)
William John Tennant (1917–1919)
Robert Bolton Ransford (1919–1921)
Bertram Edward Dunbar Kilburn (1921–1923)
Harold Wade (1923–1924)
Reginald Haddan (1924–1925)
Hubert Alexander Gill (1925–1926, 1939–1940)
Arthur George Bloxam (1926–1927)
John Edward Lloyd Barnes (1927–1928)
Reginald William James (1928–1929)
Arthur Woosnam (1929–1930)
Griffith Brewer (1930–1931)
Alfred Stuart Cachemaille (1931–1932)
Frederick Gilbert Brettell (1932–1933)
Gordon Melville Clark (1933–1934)
Alfred Augustus Thornton (1934–1935)
George Edward Folkes (1935–1936)
Richard John Tugwood (1936–1937)
Arthur Carpmael (1937–1938)
William Henry Ballantyne (1938–1939)
Henry Withers Kickweed Jennings (1940–1942)
Walter Philip Williams (1942–1943)
Ernest William Moss (1943–1944)
William Warren Triggs (1944–1945, 1949–1950)
Evan Lovell Widdrington Byrne (1945–1946)
Arthur Abbey (1946–1947)
Harold Joseph Charles Forrester (1947–1948)
Cecil Edward Every (1948–1949)
John Oswald Farrer (1950–1951)
Frederick Walter Rudolph Leistikow (1951–1952)
Edward Buckmaster Robinson (1952–1953)
William Ogilvy Duncan (1953–1954)
Edward Williamson (1954–1955)
Thomas Ballantyne Clerk (1955–1956)
Eric Walter Eustace Micklethwait (1956–1957)
James George Fife (1957–1958)
Henri Georges Bouly (1958–1959)
Harry Morgan Yeatman (1959–1960)
John Richard Tugwood (1960–1961)
Michael Hesketh-Prichard (1961–1963)
John Clifford Holgate Ellis (1963–1964)
Maurice Herbert Carpmael (1964–1965)
Alan Wilmot Beeston (1965–1966)
Charles William Morle (1966–1967)
Walter John Charles Chapple (1967–1968)
Cyril George Wickham (1968–1969)
Peter Lloyd Bowtell (1969–1970)
Owen Wynn Jaques (1970–1971)
John Stephen Bushell (1971–1972)
Walter Weston (1972–1973)
Francis William Berthold Kittel (1973–1974)
George Arthur Bloxam (1974–1975)
Nicholas James Flower (1975–1976)
John Melbourn Aubrey (1976–1977)
Arthur Terence Ranson (1977–1978)
Gordon Hawksley Edmunds (1978–1979)
Richard Courtenay Petersen (1979–1980)
Norman Waddleton (1980–1981)
John Ulysses Neukom (1981–1982)
John Henderson Dunlop (1982–1983)
Bernard Fisher (1983–1984)
Angus Henry Duncan (1984–1985)
Peter Robin Broughton Lawrence (1985–1986)
Keith Baynes Weatherald (1986–1987)
Sidney David Votier (1987–1988)
Richard John Gallafent (1988–1989)
Philip Antony Smith (1989–1990)
William Egerton Caro (1990–1991)
Clifford Lees OBE (1991–1992)
William Robert Farwell (1992–1993)
John Mackay Reid (1993–1994)
John Douglas McCall (1994–1995)
Richard Fennelly Fawcett (1995–1996)
Andrew Charles Serjeant (1996–1997)
Robert William Beckham (1997–1998)
Tibor Zoltán Gold MBE (1998–1999)
Peter Geoffrey Mole (1999–2000)
Edward Willoughby Brooke Lyndon-Stanford (2000–2001)
Timothy Wace Roberts (2001–2002)
John David Brown (2002–2003)
Anna Marie Denholm (2003–2004)
Thomas Bruce Alexander (2004–2005)
Michael Robert Harrison (2005–2006)
Barry William Treves (2006–2007)
Robert Dale Weston (2007–2008)
Dave William Bradley (2008–2009)
John David Brown (2009–2010)
Alasdair David Poore (2010–2011)
Timothy Wace Roberts (2011–2012)
Christopher Paul Mercer (2012–2013)
Roger James Burt (2013–2014)
Catriona Macleod Hammer (2014–2015)
Andrea Ruth Brewster OBE (2015–2016)
Anthony John Rollins (2016–2017)
Stephen Jones (2017–18)
Julia Florence (2019) 
Richard Mair (2020)
Alicia Instone (2021)
Alasdair David Poore (2022 - Current) - Second term

Notable members
 Sharon Bowles, British MEP
 Walter de Havilland (Foreign Member, 1909–1942)

Staff

Lee Davies is the current chief executive of CIPA. Lee joined CIPA in February 2012, having previously been the deputy chief executive of the Institute for Learning (2005-2012) and the district secretary of the Thames and Solent District of the Workers' Educational Association (1999-2005). Lee Davies is supported by a deputy chief executive Neil Lampert and a team of staff covering areas such as finance, governance, membership, professional examinations, continuing professional development, publications, public affairs, media and communications.

Informals Committee
The Informals Committee is, as its name suggests, an association of the unqualified (or part-qualified) student members of the Chartered Institute of Patent Attorneys. All CIPA student members are automatically part of the informals. The informals provide a UK-wide support network for trainees, organising lectures and tutorials directed towards the examinations, trips to the UKIPO and social events.

The informals have been very successful and influential within the institute. Much of their success is due to hard-working honorary secretaries, who chair the committee and take a seat on CIPA Council. Below is an account of honorary secretaries of the Informals Committee, many of whom went on to serve as CIPA president.

C. E. Every (1929)
Jack R. Tugwood (1930)
T.B. Clerk (1931)
H. G. Bouly and Jack R. Tugwood* (1932 - 1933) - *Second Term
H. L. Wright and J. R. Howden (1934)
L. B. Shuffrey and H. L. Wright (1935)
P. T. Stephens (1936)
J. R. Howden (1937 - 1938) - Second Term
Vacant (1939 - 1945)
Jack R. Tugwood* and Owen J. Jaques (1945) - *Third Term
Ralph C. Noyes (1946)
J. S. E. Page (1947)
Eric Dennis Swann (1948)
L. B. Shuffrey* and H. L. Wright* (1949) - *Second Term
Peter T. Bowtell (1950)
Anthony J. Wolstenholme (1951)
Arthur J. Hewlett (1952)
John S. Bushell (1953)
Gordon H. Edmunds (1954)
Eric M. Woodhead (1955) 
W. Victor Higgs (1956) 
Brian C. Reid (1957)
Derek Alan Senhenn (1958)
Iain C. Baillie and Richard Allen (1959)
Anthony John Metcalf Robinson (1960)
Alan William White (1961)
James Wendon (1962)
Gordon R. J. Masters (1963)
Andrew Charles Serjeant (1964)
Andrew Kerr (1965)
Wiliam Robert Farwell (1966)
David A. H. Carmichael and Frank Holliday (1967)
Tibor Zoltán Gold MBE (1968)
Richard John Gallafent (1969)
Christopher James Wilders Everitt (1970)
William E. Caro (1971)
John M. Cone (1972)
Robert Dale Weston (1973)
Richard John Ashmead (1974)
Alan Blum (1975)
Gillian Rowena Herrod-Hempsall (1976)
Anthony W. Jay (1977)
Brian Kenneth Charles Dunlop (1978)
Steve Lucas (1979)
Nigel Shindler (1980)
Stephen Geoffrey Unwin (1981) 
Timothy John Simon Jump (1982)
Huw Hallybone (1983)
Helen Marjorie Meredith Jones (1984)
Hugh Christopher Dunlop (1985)
Chris O'Sullivan (1986)
Graeme David McCallum and Jenny Shalom (1987)
Simon Mark Wright (1988)
Timothy John Powell (1989)
Simon James Mounteney (1990)
George William Schlich (1991)
Tony Gallafent (1992)
Nicolas Andrew Kirkham (1993)
Philippa Dianne Eke (1994)
Andrew Dominic Nunn (1995)
Alex John Frost (1996)
David Moy (1997)
Matthew Peter Critten (1998)
Katrina Peebles (1999)
Debra Lousise Lewis (2000)
Robert Charles Dempster (2001)
Kate Cecilia Rawlins (2002)
Sally Curran (2003)
Philip Micahel Barnes (2004)
Vandita Chandrani (2005)
Stuart Forrest (2006)
Claire Borton (2007)
Nerissa Elizabeth Lonergan (2008)
Riz Mohammad (2009)
Simone Ferrara (2010)
Candice Terblanche (2011)
Annabel Strawson (2012)
Andrew J. White (2013)
Parminder Lally (2014)
Ben Charig (2015)
Harry Muttock (2016)
Sara Jane Paines (2017)
Matthew Veale (2018)
Carolyn Palmer (2019)
Joel David Briscoe (2020)
Lindsay J. Pike (2021)
Kathryn Taylor (2022)

See also
 British professional bodies
 Intellectual property organization
 List of topics related to the United Kingdom
 UK Intellectual Property Office

References

External links
 

Organisations based in the City of London
Organizations established in 1882
Patent law organizations
Patent Attorneys
United Kingdom patent law